Paul Opacic (born 1966) is a British actor from Halifax, England. Best known for his roles as Carl Costello in  Hollyoaks, Steve Marchant  in Emmerdale and Mark Waddle in Bad Girls. In 2021, he joined the cast of the ITV soap opera Coronation Street as Stefan Brent.

Career
After appearing in several minor television credits in the early 1990s, including comedies Only Fools and Horses and Birds of a Feather, it was in 1996 that Opacic got his big break when he was cast in Emmerdale as Steve Marchant, a new love interest for Kim Tate. Opacic enjoyed several high-profile storylines in his time on the show, before his character was axed by producer Kieran Roberts in 1999. Opacic's stint in Emmerdale led to later appearances in Heartbeat, Doctors and Peak Practice before he joined ITV prison drama Bad Girls in 2001 at the beginning of its third series playing officer Mark Waddle. Opacic left the series the following year and last appeared at the end of the fourth series. In the ensuing years he appeared in several minor roles in programmes such as Cold Feet, The Bill and Totally Frank. In 2006, he joined the cast of the new BBC drama The Chase in a supporting role and remained with the show until it was cancelled in 2007. Further television credits include The Royal, Holby City and most recently Waterloo Road, in which he portrayed the neglectful father of one of the school pupils Finn Sharkey.

In early 2010, it was stated that Lucy Allan had quit the position of executive producer of Hollyoaks and that Paul Marquess had taken over the role. It was soon announced that Marquess planned to give the soap a "shake up". He cast Opacic in a new central family in the soap opera, stating he would play the role of Carl Costello. He stayed in the soap until 2013, and made a two-episode guest stint in 2018. In 2021, he was cast in the ITV soap opera Coronation Street as villain Stefan Brent.

Opacic is of Croatian and English heritage.

Filmography

References

External links
 

1960s births
20th-century English male actors
21st-century English male actors
Actors from Halifax, West Yorkshire
English male soap opera actors
Living people
Male actors from Yorkshire